Henry Fitzalan, 12th Earl of Arundel KG (23 April 151224 February 1580) was an English nobleman, who over his long life assumed a prominent place at the court of all the later Tudor sovereigns, probably the only person to do so.

Court career under Henry VIII

He was the only son of William Fitzalan, 11th Earl of Arundel, and his second wife Anne Percy, daughter of Henry Percy, 4th Earl of Northumberland, and was named for Henry VIII, who personally stood as his godfather at his baptism.

At 15, Henry Fitzalan became a page at the court of King Henry VIII, attending the king to Calais in 1532. When he came of age, in 1533, he was summoned to Parliament as Lord Maltravers, a subsidiary title of his father, who was still alive. He attended the trials of Anne Boleyn and her alleged lover Lord Rochford in May 1536.

In 1540 he was appointed deputy of Calais. He remained there, improving the fortifications at his own expense, until his father's death in early 1544. He returned to England to assume the earldom, and was made a Knight of the Garter. War with France soon brought him back to the continent, where he spent much of 1544. He then returned to England, where the king appointed him Lord Chamberlain.

Edward VI
After King Henry's death in 1547, the Earl was Lord High Constable at Edward VI's coronation. He continued as Lord Chamberlain, and in addition, by the terms of Henry's will, was designated one of the council of 12 assistant executors. Under the new King's uncle, Lord Protector Edward Seymour, 1st Duke of Somerset, Arundel's influence diminished, and he soon became an advocate of Somerset's removal.

Somerset was deposed and sent to the Tower of London in October 1549, with Arundel, Thomas Wriothesley, 1st Earl of Southampton, and John Dudley, Earl of Warwick (later Duke of Northumberland) among the leaders of the new governing group. In early 1550 Warwick removed Arundel and Southampton, who were religious conservatives, from office. Arundel was placed under house arrest under dubious charges of peculation. He was also fined £12,000, £8,000 of which was later remitted. Within a few months, he was cleared of the charges, but the experience pushed him into the camp of the Duke of Somerset, who had been released from the Tower and readmitted to the Privy Council. When Somerset was again arrested in 1551, Arundel was implicated in some of his plots, and was himself arrested and imprisoned for a year. He was eventually pardoned, again heavily fined, and returned to his place on the Council in May 1553.

Intrigues and position under Mary I
King Edward's health was seriously declining, and on 21 June 1553 Arundel was among those who signed Edward's letters patent which conferred the succession on Lady Jane Grey. After the King's death, and after Northumberland had left London, however, together with the Earl of Pembroke, he worked for the proclamation of Mary I on 19 July 1553. Arundel tricked Northumberland into attacking Mary, then called an assembly of the leaders of the city, denounced Northumberland, and had Mary proclaimed queen. Taking the great seal and a letter of submission by the Council, he then rode off to Framlingham, where Mary was staying. He then secured Northumberland in Cambridge, and returned to London with Mary.

At Mary's coronation, Arundel was for the second time High Constable, and was then appointed Lord Steward of the royal household. He served in various roles in her court, being, for example, one of the nobles who received her husband Philip II of Spain when he landed at Southampton. Later, he presided at the trial of the duke of Suffolk, assisted in suppressing Wyatt's rebellion in 1554, was dispatched on foreign missions, and in September 1555 accompanied Philip to Brussels. The same year he and others received a charter under the name of Company of Merchant Adventurers to New Lands, for the discovery of unknown lands, and was made high steward of the University of Oxford, being chosen chancellor in 1559, but resigning his office in the same year. In 1557, on the prospect of a war with France, he was appointed lieutenant-general of the forces for the defence of the country, and in 1558 attended the conference for the negotiation of peace. He returned to England on the death of Mary in November 1558.

In 1555 he promoted the marriage of his daughter Mary to 4th Duke of Norfolk. Mary died in August 1557 after two years of marriage but shortly before she died, she gave birth to Philip Howard, Henry's only grandson, who would also become his heir.

Positions under Elizabeth I
Although Elizabeth I did not trust him, he was too powerful to be slighted or ignored, and so he was retained in his various offices when she ascended the throne. For the third time, he had a high place at a royal coronation. However, as a Roman Catholic, he opposed the arrest of his co-religionists and the war with Scotland. He incurred the queen's displeasure in 1562 by holding a meeting at his house during her illness to consider the question of succession and promote the claims of Lady Catherine Grey. In 1564, being suspected of intrigues against the government, he was dismissed from the lord-stewardship and confined to his house, but was restored to favour in December.

In March 1566 he went to Padua, but being summoned back by the queen he returned to London on the 17th of April 1567. The following year he served on the commission of inquiry into the charges against Mary, Queen of Scots. He made use of an international incident in 1568 as a means of effecting William Cecil's overthrow, and urged upon the Spanish government the stoppage of trade.

In January he alarmed Elizabeth by communicating to her a supposed Spanish project for aiding Mary and replacing her on her throne, and put before the queen in writing his own objections to the adoption of extreme measures against her. In September, on the discovery of Norfolk's plot, he was arrested, but not having committed himself sufficiently to incur the charge of treason in the rebellion he escaped punishment, was released in March 1570, and was recalled by Robert Dudley to the council with the aim of embarrassing Cecil. He again renewed his intrigues, which were at length to some extent exposed by the discovery of the Ridolfi plot in September 1571. He was once more arrested, and not liberated till December 1572 after Norfolk's execution.

Henry died on 24 February 1580 and was buried in the Fitzalan Chapel of Arundel Castle, where a monument was erected to his memory.
 
Coaches were introduced into England from France by Henry Fitzalan, who travelled widely on the Continent in the mid-1560s.

Marriage and children

Henry Fitzalan, 12th Earl of Arundel, was first married to Katherine Grey, daughter of Thomas Grey, 2nd Marquess of Dorset, and Margaret Wotton. By her he had three children:
 Jane FitzAlan (1537–1576/7), who married John Lumley, 1st Baron Lumley
 Henry Fitzalan (1538–1556), styled Lord Maltravers 
 Mary FitzAlan (1540–1557), who married Thomas Howard, 4th Duke of Norfolk, and whose son Philip, eventually inherited the Earldom of Arundel.

It is by said marriage that Arundel was the uncle of Henry Grey, 1st Duke of Suffolk, father of Lady Jane Grey.

His second wife was Mary, daughter of Sir John Arundell of a prominent Cornish family, and widow of Robert Radcliffe, 1st Earl of Sussex. They had no children.

Portraiture

Arundel's portrait was painted several times, including once by Hans Holbein and by Hans Eworth.

References

External links
Catholic Encyclopedia article

 

1512 births
1580 deaths
16th-century English politicians
19
Court of Mary I of England
People of the Elizabethan era
Chancellors of the University of Oxford
09
Knights of the Garter
Lord-Lieutenants of Sussex
Pages of Honour
16th-century English nobility
Court of Henry VIII
Court of Elizabeth I